Of the 7 Kentucky incumbents, 6 were re-elected.

See also 
 List of United States representatives from Kentucky
 United States House of Representatives elections, 1972

1972
Kentucky
1972 Kentucky elections